The A5 Autoroute, which was constructed in 1990 to relieve the A6, links the Parisian region with the Langres area. It is a 238 km toll road under the management of the Autoroutes Paris-Rhin-Rhône (APRR). It makes up parts of the European routes E54, E511, and E17. Before the A5 was completed, the section linking Troyes with Langres was known as the A26. This route crosses the departments of Seine-et-Marne (in the Ile-de-France region), Yonne (in the Burgundy region), Aube and Haute-Marne (in the Champagne-Ardenne region).

In Île-de-France, before reaching its western terminus at La Francilienne, the A5 splits into two branches which were previously referred to as the A5a and the A5b. They have since been renumbered, with the A5a being designated as the A5 and the A5b becoming part of the A105 (a spur route linking La Francilienne, the A5, and the town of Melun). However, the two branches are often still referred to as the "A5a" and "A5b".

Proposed Eastern Extension

The French
Government has given the green light for the completion of the natural continuation of the A5 beyond Langres towards Switzerland and Mulhouse by granting permission for the construction of a toll motorway from Langres to Vesoul currently known as the A319 (planned opening  after 2030).  The remainder of the section must be supported by the State in the form of a 2 × 2 lane expressway (RN 19) connecting to the A36 between Belfort and Montbéliard and beyond to the A16 Swiss motorway.  The combination of the current A5 motorway and this extension could eventually become a future A5 motorway linking Paris to Switzerland.

List of Exits and Junctions

A5

A105

European Routes

A5

A105

References

External links 

 Autoroute A5 on Saratlas

A05